"Acceptance" is the first episode of the second season of House, written by Russel Friend & Garrett Lerner and directed by Dan Attias. House and his team have to diagnose and cure a death row inmate.

Plot
A death row inmate, Clarence, starts having mysterious hallucinations, he was seeing all the people he killed in the past, and his heart malfunctioned. His heart starts pumping air instead of blood and he has trouble breathing. House discovers that he had fluid in his lungs. House likes the mystery and wanted to admit him to the hospital immediately before it is too late. As Clarence was a dangerous criminal, they have to clear a whole floor to examine and treat him. House got Stacy to get a court order. Cuddy is not in favor of this plan and wants him out as soon as he gets better.  They have to send him back to death row as soon as he got better to receive his death penalty. House is killing him by curing him.

The team realizes that the inmate has much acid in his blood and speculates he was taking drugs. The reason for the delay was the doctors not testing for the drug. It was unexpected. House sends Chase back to prison to inspect the cell Clarence was sleeping in, in order to find the cause of all the acid by deduction: toner solvent. House tricks Clarence to a whisky slammer session to displace hepatic metabolism of the deadly cocktail. 
 
Meanwhile, Cameron feels that the hospital is spending money on Clarence unnecessarily because he is going to die no matter what the outcome is. She wants House to focus on those who really need help. House refuses, leaving Cameron to deal with it herself. Cameron treats a woman with terminal cancer on her own. She sees a friend in her and shows sympathy toward her, because she is alone. Clarence sees Foreman's tattoo and wonders how he went from a gang to wearing a white coat. Hemorrhagic ischemic enterocolitic ulcerative rupture, or mucosal integrity compromise in the large intestine linked to the phaeochromocytoma, erupts as sudden onset anal haemorrhage during spasmodic fit. Clarence is subject to extended MRI imaging despite significant pain from contraindication (subdermal inking) in the hunt for the tumour. Clarence is diagnosed with phaeochromocytoma, it is surgically removed and he is then sent back to death row to receive his death penalty.

Rivalry is shown between House and Stacy when they start working together, but toward the end of the episode they start to accept each other as co-workers.

House (season 2) episodes
2006 American television episodes
Television episodes about death
Television episodes directed by Dan Attias
Television episodes set in prisons
Prison healthcare in fiction

fr:Peine de vie